Civic Stadium was an outdoor athletic stadium in the northwest United States, located in Eugene, Oregon. For most of its history it was owned by the Eugene School District. Opened in 1938, the stadium was destroyed by fire in 2015 on June 29.

History
Civic Stadium, located near East 20th Avenue and Willamette Street, adjacent to South Eugene High School, had a seating capacity of 6,800. Built  in 1938 through a public-private partnership between the Eugene Area Chamber of Commerce, Eugene School District 4J, and the federal Works Progress Administration (WPA); the property had been owned by the school district from its construction until spring 2015. In October 2008, Civic Stadium was added to the National Register of Historic Places.

Originally built for high school football and baseball, in 1969 it became the home of the Eugene Emeralds minor league baseball team, which previously played at the privately owned Bethel Park (north of Roosevelt Boulevard; its outfield is present-day Lark Park). The Emeralds moved up to the Pacific Coast League (AAA) in 1969 and needed a larger venue. After five seasons in the PCL, they returned to the Class A Northwest League in 1974 and played in the stadium through 2009. (High school football moved to the University of Oregon's Autzen Stadium in 1969, following the installation of artificial turf.) Before the departure of the Emeralds in 2009, Civic Stadium was one of the ten oldest active minor league baseball facilities in the United States.

The lighted playing field at Civic Stadium had an unorthodox alignment, oriented southeast (home plate to center field); the recommended alignment of a baseball diamond is east-northeast.

Emeralds relocate
In August 2009, the Emeralds announced their relocation to the University of Oregon's PK Park for the 2010 season. The Emeralds cited Civic Stadium's need of substantial renovations, major problems with irrigation and electrical systems, as well as broken seats, and estimated that modernization could cost as much as $15 million.

The Emeralds played their last game at Civic Stadium on Thursday, September 4, 2009, a 5–3 loss to the Salem-Keizer Volcanoes. Following the game, fans collected pieces of the outfield turf as souvenirs.

Disuse and destruction

By 2009, the school district designated the stadium a surplus property, although the district had not made a decision on whether to sell it. As recently as 2007, the school district examined options to redevelop all or part of the property, most likely as medium-density residential units. A local group, Friends of Civic Stadium, started a grassroots campaign in support of restoring the historic venue while also attempting to find alternative tenants.

With the future of the stadium in flux, it was one of ten entries on Restore Oregon's Most Endangered Places in Oregon 2011 list.

In April 2015, the Eugene Civic Alliance raised $4.1 million to buy the stadium and 10 acres of surrounding property from the school district. Eugene Civic Alliance is a non-profit made up of community leaders, including Lane United FC managing director Dave Galas, and the executive director of the Eugene youth sports organization Kidsports, former Ducks basketball player Bev Smith.

On June 29, 2015, Civic Stadium was destroyed by fire.  Two days later, officials charged four pre-teen boys in connection with the fire, although the cause had not yet been determined conclusively. It was delisted from the National Register of Historic Places on March 8, 2016.

See also

 List of Oregon's Most Endangered Places
 National Register of Historic Places listings in Lane County, Oregon

References

External links
 

1938 establishments in Oregon
2015 disestablishments in Oregon
American football venues in Oregon
Baseball venues in Oregon
Defunct baseball venues in the United States
Demolished sports venues in Oregon
Demolished buildings and structures in Oregon
Former National Register of Historic Places in Oregon
National Register of Historic Places in Eugene, Oregon
Oregon's Most Endangered Places
Soccer venues in Oregon
Sports venues completed in 1938
Sports venues demolished in 2015
Sports venues in Eugene, Oregon
Sports venues on the National Register of Historic Places in Oregon
Works Progress Administration in Oregon